Jahwan Edwards (born July 27, 1992) is an American football running back who is currently a free agent. He played college football at Ball State. He is Ball State's all-time leader in career rushing yards with 4,558 yards and rushing touchdowns with 51.

High school
Edwards lettered all four years in high school helping his team to a 56–3 record in his time with the Butler Bulldogs.  The Bulldogs won back to back state championships in his junior and senior year and Edwards was named Most Valuable Player in both state championship games.  He rushed for a total of 2,979 yards with 30 receptions for 463 yards and 62 touchdowns in his high school career.

College career
Ball State's 2011 season opener under new head coach Pete Lembo was an in-state cross conference match versus the Big Ten's Indiana University at Lucas Oil Stadium in Indianapolis on September 3.   Edwards carried the ball 16 time for 84 yards and made his first career pass reception vs. the Hoosiers.  Ball State went on to upset Indiana 27–20.  
Edwards made his first college touchdown in the loss to nationally ranked (#22) South Florida.  One of his many highlights from this season would be the three touchdowns he scored against Army.  Edwards lead Ball State in rushing with 786 yards and he finished the season ranked 9th in the MAC with 11 touchdowns scored.

With 1410 yards rushing and 14 touchdowns in 2012, Edwards helped to lead the Ball State Cardinals to a 9–3 season.  The Cardinals racked up important wins over #25th ranked Toledo 34–27, the then Big East's South Florida 31-27 and for a second year in a row the Big Ten's Indiana 41–39.  The three regular season losses came to # 12 ranked Clemson, Kent State and Northern Illinois.  Both Kent State and Northern Illinois would go on to be ranked in the top 25.  With the 9–3 record Ball State was selected to play in the Beef 'O' Brady's Bowl game in St. Petersburg Florida where they were ultimately defeated by the University of Central Florida 38–17.

In 2013, for the third year in a row Edwards was the top rusher for the Cardinals 1110 yards.  He finished the season ranked 19th in the nation with 14 rushing touchdowns.  Edwards gained national attention after he ran for 155 yards and 3 touchdowns in Ball State's 48–27 win over Virginia.
Edwards helped lead the Ball State Cardinals to another successful season, finishing 10-3 after the loss to Arkansas State in the GoDaddy Bowl on January 5, 2014.  Edwards under head coach Pete Lembo helped the Ball State Cardinals become bowl eligible for the third consecutive year.  Edwards added 146 yards rushing and 1 touchdown to his season total in the 20–23 loss to Arkansas State in the GoDaddy Bowl.

Edwards began the 2014 season as the record holder for most rushing touchdowns at Ball State, with 39. He also started the season with 3,306 career rushing yards, only 697 yards away from the Ball State all-time leading rusher record. Edwards became the all-time leading rusher at Ball State during the October 18, victory over Central Michigan, breaking Marcus Merriweather's 4,002 record.  By the end of the season Edwards joined the List of NCAA Division I FBS players with at least 50 career rushing touchdowns tied for 26 on the list with 51 touchdowns.

College awards
 2014 Doak Walker Award Candidate 
 2013 All-Mid-American Conference Second-team 
 2013 ESPN Helmet Sticker Award vs. Virginia (10/5/13) 
 AT&T All-America Player of the Week vs. Virginia (10/5/13) 
 2013 Doak Walker Award Candidate 
 2012 All-Mid-American Conference Third-team 
 2011 Ball State John Hodge Award as the team's Most Outstanding Freshman

Professional career

San Diego Chargers
On May 12, 2015, Edwards signed with the San Diego Chargers as an undrafted free agent. On August 30, 2015, he was released by the Chargers.

Atlanta Falcons
On September 8, 2015, Edwards was signed to the Atlanta Falcons' practice squad. On October 27, 2015, Edwards was released by the Falcons.

Jacksonville Jaguars 
On December 9, 2015, Edwards was signed to the Jacksonville Jaguars' practice squad. On December 18, 2015, Edwards was released by the Jaguars.

Miami Dolphins 
On December 21, 2015, Edwards was signed to the Miami Dolphins' practice squad.

Cleveland Browns 
On August 20, 2016, Edwards signed with the Browns. On September 3, 2016, he was released by the Browns.

References

External links
Ball State Cardinals bio

1992 births
Living people
American football running backs
Ball State Cardinals football players
Players of American football from North Carolina
Atlanta Falcons players
San Diego Chargers players
Jacksonville Jaguars players
Miami Dolphins players
Cleveland Browns players
People from Matthews, North Carolina